Hilde Seipp (1909–1999) was a German stage and film actress.

Selected filmography
 Togger (1937)
 The Beaver Coat (1937)
 Serenade (1937)

References

Bibliography
 Giesen, Rolf. Nazi Propaganda Films: A History and Filmography. McFarland & Company, 2003.

External links 
 

1909 births
1999 deaths
German film actresses
German stage actresses
Actresses from Berlin
20th-century German actresses